Xenic acid is a proposed noble gas compound with the chemical formula H2XeO4 or XeO2(OH)2. It has not been isolated, and the published characterization data are ambiguous.

Salts of xenic acid are called xenates, containing the  anion, such as monosodium xenate. They tend to disproportionate into xenon gas and perxenates:

2  + 2  →  + Xe +  + 2 

The energy given off is sufficient to form ozone from diatomic oxygen:

3  (g) → 2  (g)

Salts containing the deprotonated anion  are presently unknown.

References

Further reading
 

Xenon(VI) compounds
Mineral acids
Oxoacids